George is an anthropomorphic pink hippo and a character of the children's television programme Rainbow, voiced by Roy Skelton and operated by Valerie Heberden, Malcolm Lord, Tony Holtham and later Craig Crane.

Sporting long eyelashes, George often appeared to be initially outwitted by the more extrovert and egotistical Zippy. However in the manner of The Tortoise and the Hare, George normally won through in the end.

George was fond of stories from the Rainbow book.

George's "catchphrase" was his own delayed and elongated goodbye at the end of the show, i.e. Geoffrey, Zippy, Bungle, Rod, Jane, Freddy would say "goodbye" normally, followed by a one-second pause and then George's own "good by-eye". This was because Roy Skelton would voice both George and Zippy, meaning that they could not speak at the same time.

Further reading
 Climbing High: Life Under the Rainbow Exposed by V. S. Ganjabhang and Mike Anderiesz, Pan MacMillan (2002)
 The A-Z of Classic Children's Television by Simon Sheridan, Reynolds & Hearn (2007)
 Rainbow Unzipped: The Shocking Truth about Zippy, George and Bungle - In Their Own Words by Tim Randall, Headline (2009)
 Zippy and Me: My Life Inside Britain's Most Infamous Puppet by Ronnie LeDrew, Unbound (2019)

References

Television characters introduced in 1973
Rainbow (TV series) characters
Fictional hippopotamuses
Male characters in television
British comedy puppets